Lactarius xanthogalactus, commonly known as the yellow-staining milkcap is a poisonous species of fungus in the family Russulaceae. The species is found on the west coast of the United States and grows in the ground in association with hardwood and conifer trees. There are several other Lactarius species that bear resemblance to L. xanthogalactus, but most can be distinguished by differences in staining reactions, macroscopic characteristics, or habitat.

Description
When it is cut or injured, the mushroom oozes a white latex that rapidly turns bright sulfur-yellow. The spores are pale yellow, elliptical and bumpy. It has an unpleasant taste.

Taxonomy and classification
The species was first described by American mycologist Charles Horton Peck in 1907.

The specific epithet xanthogalactus is derived from the Greek words meaning "yellow" and "milk".

Similar species

Lactarius vinaceorufescens has nearly identical microscopic features to L. xanthogalactus, but macroscopically it has reddish-vinaceous stains that develop on the cap, gills, and stem. Another lookalike is L. colorascens, but it may be distinguished from L. xanthogalactus by several features: a smaller fruit body; a whitish cap that becomes brownish-red with age and does not spot vinaceous or brown; bitter to faintly acrid latex; and slightly smaller spores. L. chrysorrheus is also similar, but it has a whitish to pale yellowish-cinnamon cap with slightly darker spots and grows under hardwoods (especially oak) on well-drained, often sandy soil, and its gills do not discolor or spot vinaceous or brown.

Other superficially similar species include L. rubrilacteus, L. rufus, L. subviscidus, L. fragilis and L. rufulus, but none of these species have the yellow staining reaction characteristic of L. xanthogalactus. It could also be mistaken with L. rubidus, which is redder and sweet smelling, and L. substriatus, which has a red-orange cap and white latex that yellows.

Habitat and distribution
The fruit bodies of Lactarius xanthogalactus grow scattered or in groups on the ground under conifers and hardwoods between August and January in Washington, Oregon and California.

See also

List of Lactarius species

References

xanthogalactus
Fungi described in 1907
Fungi of the United States
Taxa named by Charles Horton Peck
Fungi without expected TNC conservation status